Shree Kulswamini Dhandai Devi (Verai, Dandini) Mandir is a Hindu temple located at Mhasdi near Sakri Taluka in Maharashtra, India. Here, the worship of the goddess Kulswamini Dhandai Devi is carried on right next to the Dhandai Plane, once a center of Hinduism. 

The temple is a prime spot of worship for the Kshatriya Patil People And Maratha Kunbi People. But along with the Kshatriya Kunbi and Maratha Family Kulswamini Dhandai Devi is worshipped by many some caste, people especially those belonging to the Marathi Bhramin and somewhat Lonari and Marathi Mali caste as their presiding family deity, Kuldevi or Kuldevta. 

The devotees throng the temple on all occasions of Navaratri and Chaitri Navratra to worship and celebrate. It is believed that the Goddess has magical powers.

Shree Kulswamini Dhandai Devi is Kuldevi of Shinde/Scindia (Sarpatils) of Khandesh. Who came from Amirgarh (Present in Rajasthan) as Rao of West Khandesh in and 14th century. In 1500s The Rao Shinde family, Deore family and Bedse family came from Rajasthan and has same clan deity in past. they made a stone architecture marathi temple and started worship as Kuldevi. Dhandai Devi also worshiped in Marathi caste like Mali (Mahajan), Brahmin, Koli, Bhoi etc.

References

Hindu temples in Maharashtra
Shakti temples